Austin Beatty Williams (October 17, 1919 – October 27, 1999) was an American carcinologist, "the acknowledged expert on and leader in studies of the systematics of eastern American decapod crustaceans".

Biography
Austin B. Williams was born on October 17, 1919, in Plattsburg, Missouri, the eldest of three children to Oliver Perry Williams and Lucy Sell. He was educated at McPherson College and the University of Kansas, gaining his Ph.D. in 1951. He then worked at the University of North Carolina Institute of Fisheries Research, the University of Illinois, before gaining a position in the systematics laboratory of the National Marine Fisheries Service, based at the Smithsonian Institution. He was married and had one son and two grandchildren. He died of cancer at Falls Church, Virginia, on October 27, 1999.

Work
Williams' first scientific paper, published in 1952, described six new species of freshwater crayfish from the Ozark Mountains of Arkansas, Missouri and Oklahoma; he continued to publish until his death in 1999, accruing 118 publications in that time. His most important works include monographs on the marine decapod crustaceans of the Carolinas, on the decapods of the Atlantic coast of the United States, and on the lobsters of the world's oceans. He won several awards, including the Crustacean Society's Excellence in Research Award and the American Fisheries Society's Oscar Elton Sette Award.

Taxa
Austin B. Williams described or co-described 101 new taxa of decapod crustaceans, from the rank of subspecies to superfamily (obelisks mark fossil taxa):

Caridea
Alvinocaris Williams & Chace, 1982
Alvinocaris lusca Williams & Chace, 1982
Alvinocaris markensis Williams, 1988
Alvinocaris muricola Williams, 1988
Alvinocaris stactophila Williams, 1988
Leptalpheus Williams, 1965
Leptalpheus forceps Williams, 1965
Ogyrides hayi Williams, 1981
Ogyrides limicola Williams, 1955
Opaepele Williams & Dobbs, 1995
Opaepele loihi Williams & Dobbs, 1995
Rimicaris Williams & Rona, 1986
Rimicaris chacei Williams & Rona, 1986
Rimicaris exoculata Williams & Rona, 1986

Astacidea
Homarinus Kornfield, Williams & Steneck, 1995
Orconectes eupunctus Williams, 1952
Orconectes meeki brevis Williams, 1952
Orconectes nana Williams, 1952
Orconectes nana marcus Williams, 1952
Orconectes neglectus chaenodactylus Williams, 1952
Orconectes ozarkae Williams, 1952

Axiidea
†Axiopsis eximia Kensley & Williams, 1990
Calocaris jenneri Williams, 1974
Calocaris oxypleura Williams, 1974

Gebiidea
Aethogebia Williams, 1993
Aethogebia gorei Williams, 1993
Pomatogebia Williams & Ngoc-Ho, 1990
Upogebia acanthops Williams, 1986
Upogebia aestuari Williams, 1993
Upogebia aquilina Williams, 1993
Upogebia baldwini Williams, 1997
Upogebia bermudensis Williams, 1993
Upogebia burkenroadi Williams, 1986
Upogebia careospina Williams, 1993
Upogebia casis Williams, 1993
Upogebia cocosia Williams, 1986
Upogebia coralliflora Williams & Scott, 1989
Upogebia cortesi Williams, 2000
Upogebia dawsoni Williams, 1986
Upogebia felderi Williams, 1993
Upogebia galapagensis Williams, 1986
Upogebia inomissa Williams, 1993
Upogebia jonesi Williams, 1986
Upogebia lepta Williams, 1986
Upogebia maccraryae Williams, 1986
Upogebia macginitieorum Williams, 1986
Upogebia molipollex Williams, 1993
Upogebia omissago Williams, 1993
Upogebia onychion Williams, 1986
Upogebia paraffinis Williams, 1993
Upogebia pillsbury Williams, 1993
Upogebia ramphula Williams, 1986
Upogebia schmitti Williams, 1986
Upogebia spinistipula Williams & Heard, 1991
Upogebia synagelas Williams, 1987
Upogebia tenuipollex Williams, 1986
Upogebia thistlei Williams, 1986
Upogebia toralae Williams & Hernández-Aguilera, 1998
Upogebia vargasae Williams, 1997
Upogebia veleronis Williams, 1986

Anomura
Munidopsis alvisca Williams, 1998
Munidopsis glabra Pequegnat & Williams, 1995
Munidopsis granosicorium Williams & Baba, 1990
Munidopsis lentigo Williams & Van Dover, 1983
Munidopsis lignaria Williams & Baba, 1990
Munidopsis marianica Williams & Baba, 1990
Shinkaia Baba & Williams, 1998
Shinkaia crosnieri Baba & Williams, 1998
Uroptychus edisoniscus Baba & Williams, 1998

Brachyura
Allactaea Williams, 1974
Allactaea lithorostrata Williams, 1974
Bothromaia Williams & Moffit, 1991
Bothromaia griffini Williams & Moffit, 1991
Bythograeoidea Williams, 1980
Bythograeidae Williams, 1980
Bythograea Williams, 1980
Bythograea mesatlantica Williams, 1988
Bythograea thermydon Williams, 1980
Callinectes similis Williams, 1966
Cyclozodion Williams & Child, 1989
Cyclozodion tuberatum Williams & Child, 1989
Epilobocera wetherbeei Rondríguez & Williams, 1995
Eplumula Williams, 1982
†Heus Bishop & Williams, 2000
†Heus forsteri Bishop & Williams, 2000
Hypsophrys noar Williams, 1974
Latreillia manningi Williams, 1982
Latreillia metanesa Williams, 1982
Menippe adina Williams & Felder, 1986
Mimilambridae Williams, 1979
Mimilambrus Williams, 1979
Mimilambrus wileyi Williams, 1979
†Necrocarcinus olsonorum Bishop & Williams, 1991
Ovalipes stephensoni Williams, 1976
Panopeus austrobesus Williams, 1984
Panopeus margentus Williams & Boschi, 1990
Panopeus meridionalis Williams, 1984
Plagiophthalmus bjorki Bishop & Williams, 2000
Raninella manningi Bishop & Williams, 2000
Rochinia decipiata Williams & Eldgredge, 1994
Stilbomastax Williams, Shaw & Hopkins, 1977

One genus and several species were named by other scientists in honor of Williams. They include:
Plesionika williamsi Forest, 1974 – a species of deep-water shrimp 
Agostocaris williamsi Hart & Manning, 1986 – a species of shrimp from the Caribbean Sea
Austinograea williamsi Hessler & Martin, 1989 – a crab from hydrothermal vents; both the genus and the specific epithet commemorate Williams

References

External links

American carcinologists
1919 births
1999 deaths
National Oceanic and Atmospheric Administration personnel
People from Plattsburg, Missouri
McPherson College alumni
University of Kansas alumni
University of Illinois faculty
University of North Carolina at Chapel Hill faculty
Deaths from cancer in Virginia
20th-century American zoologists